The Asian section of the 2018 FIVB Volleyball Women's Challenger Cup qualification acts as qualifiers for the 2018 FIVB Volleyball Women's Challenger Cup, for national teams which are members of the Asian Volleyball Confederation (AVC). This tournament was held in Almaty, Kazakhstan. The eventual winner will earn the right to compete in the 2018 FIVB Volleyball Women's Challenger Cup .

Qualification
3 AVC national teams entered qualification.

Pool standing procedure
 Number of matches won
 Match points
 Sets ratio
 Points ratio
 Result of the last match between the tied teams

Match won 3–0 or 3–1: 3 match points for the winner, 0 match points for the loser
Match won 3–2: 2 match points for the winner, 1 match point for the loser

Round robin
Venue:  Baluan Sholak Sports Palace, Almaty, Kazakhstan
All times are Almaty Time (UTC+06:00).

|}

|}

References

External links
Asian Volleyball Confederation – official website
AVC Continental Qualifications – official website

Women's volleyball competitions
FIVB
2018 FIVB Volleyball Women's Challenger Cup qualification